The 1993 Humo European Open was a professional ranking snooker tournament that took place between 12 and 19 December 1993 at the Arenahal in Antwerp, Belgium.

Stephen Hendry won the tournament, defeating Ronnie O'Sullivan 9–5 in the final. This was the second consecutive ranking final contested between these two players, after the 1993 UK Championship, in which O'Sullivan became the youngest winner of a ranking event.



Main draw

References

European Masters (snooker)
European Open2
European Open2
European Open
Snooker in Belgium
Sports competitions in Antwerp